Mahalakshmi Temple or Mahalaxmi Temple may refer to:
 Mahalakshmi Temple, Kolhapur considered a Shakti Peeth
 Mahalakshmi Temple, Mumbai, a prominent Mumbai landmark
 Mahalakshmi Temple, Dahanu, a temple at Dahanu